Antonio Megías Gaspar (born 3 July 1984) is a Spanish footballer who plays for Socuéllamos as a striker.

Club career
Born in Murcia, Megías finished his development at Atlético Madrid. From there onwards he played exclusively in the lower leagues of his country, never competing in higher than Segunda División B; his first spell in that level was the first part of 2005–06 with Alcalá, with the campaign ending in relegation after the player had already left for Arenas.

On 14 January 2010, Megías signed a contract with Slovak club MFK Košice, in what was his first top level experience. He returned to his country in the summer, however, joining La Roda in Tercera División and scoring nine goals in his first season as the team promoted to the third level for the first time ever.

Megías improved his league tally to ten in 2011–12, helping La Roda retain its league status after finishing ninth. He subsequently resumed his career in division three, representing Cartagena Toledo but also Socuéllamos in Tercera División.

References

External links

Kosice official profile 

1984 births
Living people
Spanish footballers
Spanish expatriate footballers
Footballers from Murcia
Association football forwards
Segunda División B players
Tercera División players
Real Murcia Imperial players
RSD Alcalá players
Motril CF players
La Roda CF players
FC Cartagena footballers
CD Toledo players
UD Socuéllamos players
Slovak Super Liga players
FC VSS Košice players
Expatriate footballers in Slovakia
Spanish expatriate sportspeople in Slovakia